Daniel Frederick Lett (born April 16, 1959) is a Canadian actor.  He has acted in films, theatre and television. His principal roles have been in the series F/X, The X-Files, E.N.G., Street Legal, Wind at My Back, and Made in Canada.

Born in Toronto, Ontario, Lett attended White Oaks Secondary School in nearby Oakville, Ontario.

Lett is a three-time Gemini Award winner.

Partial filmography

 Mrs. Soffel (1984) - Young Man (uncredited)
 The Suicide Murders (1985, TV Movie) - Buddy
 Big Deal (1985) - Bob Bowers
 Blue Monkey (1987) - Ted Andrews
 The Women of Windsor (1992, TV Movie) - Assistant Press Secretary
 Paris, France (1993) - William / Michael's partner
 The X-Files (1993, TV Series) - Sir Malcolm Marsden
 Due South (1994-1998, TV Series) - Carver Dunn / Dr. Weingarten
 Butterbox Babies (1995) - Robertson
 Choices of the Heart: The Margaret Sanger Story (1995, TV Movie) - Reporter #2
 Goosebumps (1995, TV Series) - Mr. Dark
 Sugartime (1995, TV Movie) - Maitre 'd
 Net Worth (1995, TV Movie) - Bruce Norris
 Little Bear (1995, TV Series) - Rusty Bear
 No One Could Protect Her (1996) - Nick Foster
 Livs of Girls and Women (1996, TV Movie) - Art Chamberlain
 Conundrum (1996, TV Movie) - Jimmy Khang
 Under the Piano (1996, TV Movie) - Dr. Harkness
 Dinner Along the Amazon (1996, TV Short) - Michael Penney
 A Prayer in the Dark (1997, TV Movie) - Herb Hill
 Double Take (1997) - Detective Hardaway
 The Planet of Junior Brown (1997) - Mr. Roundtree
 Hayseed (1997) - Liam Burbage
 Blind Faith (1998) - Frank Minor
 My Date with the President's Daughter (1998, TV Series) - Agent McKible
 Thanks of a Grateful Nation (1998, TV Movie) - Dr. Lucifer
 Made in Canada (1998-2003, TV Series) - Victor Sela
 Babar: King of the Elephants (1999) - King Babar (voice)
 Dead Aviators (1999, TV Movie) - Mr. Frears
 Strange Justice (1999, TV Movie) - Gil Middledrook
 The Life Before This (1999) - Sam
 The Secret Laughter of Women (1999) - John
 Babar (2000, TV Series) - King Babar
 Anne of Green Gables: the Continuing Story (2000, TV Mini-Series) - Water Owen
 Songs in Ordinary Time (2000, TV Movie) - Briscoe
 Get a Clue (2002, TV Movie) - Frank Gold
 Queer As Folk (2002-2003, TV Series) - Garth Racine
 Penguins Behind Bars1 (2003, TV Short) - District Attourney / Judge (voice)
 The Reagans (2003, TV Movie) - Robert H. Tuttle
 Cavedweller (2004) - Reverend Hillman
 The Prize Winner of Defiance, Ohio (2005) - Detective Feeney
 You Might as Well Live (2009) - J. Amberson De Whitt
 Pure Pwnage (2010, TV Series) - Narrator (voice)
 Babar and the Adventures of Badou (2010-2011, TV Series) - Pom (voice)
 Cubicle Warriors (2013) - Dick Wadkins
 Maps to the Stars (2014) - Talkshow Host
 Born to Be Blue (2015) - Danny Friedman
 Beeba Boys (2015) - Blonski
 X-Men: Apocalypse (2016) - Defense Secretary Weisberg
 The Meaning of Life (2017) - Finn's Dad
 The Shape of Water (2017) - Cadillac Salesman
 Molly's Game (2017) - David Sagen
 Mysticons (2017, TV Series) - Nova Terron (voice)
 Georgetown (2019) - Robert Pearson
 Disappearance at Clifton Hill (2019) - Randy
 Feel the Beat (2020) - Burt Davenport (Announcer)
 I Was Lorena Bobbitt (2021) - Paul Ebert

References

External links
 

Canadian male television actors
Male actors from Toronto
Canadian male voice actors
Living people
1959 births